Anarchist Protected Area is a  park in British Columbia, Canada, with limited public access.

It was established by BC Parks "to provide increased representation of low elevation forests that are under-represented in the protected area system, including Douglas fir and ponderosa pine".

It is named after nearby Anarchist Mountain.

References

Parks in British Columbia